Pontoffel Pock, Where Are You? (renamed Pontoffel Pock & His Magic Piano for the sing-a-long videocassette release) is an animated  musical television special written by Dr. Seuss, directed by Gerard Baldwin, produced by DePatie–Freleng Enterprises, and completed in 1979 but first aired on ABC on May 2, 1980. This was one of the final productions done at DePatie–Freleng as the studio would be sold to Marvel Comics and become Marvel Productions in 1981. The songs are by Sesame Street composer Joe Raposo.

The special was nominated for an Emmy Award for "Outstanding Animated Program" the first year that award was given.

The story has been noted for its satirical critique of capitalist structures.

Plot
On his first day working at Gickler's Dill Pickle factory, young Pontoffel Pock is walked through his duty by Gil Gickler where he must push the lever called the push 'em and pull the rope called pull 'em as he is given a dill pickle badge. After Gickler walks away, Pontoffel accidentally breaks the push 'em by pulling it. This caused an alarm to go off as the machinery malfunctions and a dill pickle flood occurs that the other workers had to put a stop to while Pontoffel is shown taking refuge on top of a machinery with Gickler while giving him an "I don't know" gesture. Once the crisis was averted, Gickler angrily calls Pontoffel a disgrace to his dill pickle badge, rips it off him, and orders him to kindly and quietly leave Gickler's Dill Pickle Works and never return.

Upon returning to his dilapidated home, Pontoffel wishes that he could "get away from it all". He is visited by McGillicuddy, a representative of the "Amalgamated Do-Gooding Fairies" who grants his wish by giving him a magical flying piano that can take him anywhere in the world. To do so, Pontoffel plays a simple fanfare and then chooses a destination by pressing one of many differently-colored buttons. 

Pontoffel first goes to a country called Groogen, but gets carried away and starts recklessly flying through the sky, scaring the Groogenites and causing havoc. The magistrate of Groogen rules in that they load up the "Goomy Gun", which fires multicolored paint, to drive Pontoffel away. After being hit by the gun, Pontoffel plummets downward, but is able to send himself home at the last second.

McGillicuddy attempts to take the piano back due to Pontoffel's mishandling of it, but Pontoffel begs him for a second chance. McGillicuddy chooses a random destination for Pontoffel and sends him to Casbahmopolis. 

In Casbahmopolis, Pontoffel sees a procession for Neefa Feefa, a famous "eyeball dancer", and the two fall in love. Pontoffel follows her to the palace where she dances for the king. Pontoffel promises his piano can take them anywhere, and they are pursued and surrounded by the palace guards, one of whom breaks the Homing Pigeon Switch off the piano upon hearing Pontoffel's attempt of its use for escape. Choosing a random button as an alternative but unsuccessful option to escape, he loses control of the piano as it tilts over upon Neefa Feefa sitting on top of it, leading Neefa Feefa into slipping off of it and into the guards' clutches, without Pontoffel knowing at first. Not remembering which button can take him back to her, Pontoffel starts pushing random buttons, sending him to several different places such as the North Pole, the Congo region, Spain, Waikiki, Africa, Japan, and others, including Seuss's birthplace of Springfield, Massachusetts) in the hope of returning to her.

Meanwhile, McGillicuddy gets worried that his superiors will discover what is happening with the piano, and enlists the help of all of his fairy associates to fly all over the world, looking for Pontoffel. Eventually the Head Fairy sends out all the reserves to locate it, but none of them can find it in time. Along the way, Pontoffel ends up in a stormy sky twice which sets the piano on fire with lightning, and later, Pontoffel ends up lost in Japan where there is heavy rain.

Finally remembering the right button, Pontoffel goes straight to Neefa Feefa, only to crash-land into the tower where she is being kept prisoner and destroy the piano. Neefa Feefa voices a wish to "get away from it all", just as Pontoffel had earlier, which comes to the attention of the fairies who appear to grant her wish. They are escorted home together, with the Fairies having to carry the now-damaged piano with ropes.

Pontoffel is rehired by Gickler where Neefa Feefa was also hired after hearing about their exploits. Pock finally gets the instructions right. Outside Gickler's Dill Pickle Works, a rainbow appears as the Fairies are still carrying the worn-out piano away.

Cast
 Sue Allen - Neefa Feefa 
 Ken Lundie - Higby
 Don Messick - Humboldt
 Wayne Morton - Pontoffel Pock, Factory Workers
 Joe Raposo - Gil Gickler, Groogen Musician, Senior Fairy, Groogen Dairywoman
 Hal Smith - McGillicuddy, Good Fairy-in-Chief, Groogen Cop

Songs
 "Pull on the Pull 'Em" - Joe Raposo and Chorus
 "I Had Failed" - Wayne Morton and Chorus
 "The House that My Family Had Left Me" - Wayne Morton (to the tune of "My Bonnie Lies Over the Ocean")
 "This Wondrous Piano" - Hal Smith 
 "Welcome to Groogen" - Chorus
 "I'm Flying Free" - Wayne Morton
 "Load Up The Goomy Gun" - Chorus
 "Optic Coptic (AKA The Eyes Song)" - Sue Allen and Wayne Morton (ending with a brief reprise to "This Wondrous Piano") 
 "Pontoffel Pock, Where the Heck Are You?" - Hal Smith and Sue Allen
 "Pull On the Pull 'Em (Reprise)" - Joe Raposo, Wayne Morton, Sue Allen, and Chorus

Home media 
This special was released on VHS in 1989 by CBS/Fox Video under the Playhouse Video label and in 1992 by Random House Home Video. A sing along VHS was released by CBS Video in 1996 under the title Pontoffel Pock and the Magical Piano. It was released with The Lorax on both VHS and DVD by Universal Studios Home Entertainment in 2003 and again on its Deluxe Edition Blu-ray reprint in 2012 by Warner Home Video (which also included The Butter Battle Book). In March 2021, Pontoffel Pock, Where Are You? was re-released as an extra on digital retailer versions of Dr. Seuss on the Loose (which was titled Dr. Seuss's Green Eggs and Ham and Other Treats on this release), again along with The Butter Battle Book. Both extras were remastered in high definition exclusively for this release.

See also 
 Oh, the Places You'll Go!

References

External links 
 
 
 

1980 television specials
1980s American animated films
1980s American television specials
1980s animated television specials
Television shows written by Dr. Seuss
American Broadcasting Company television specials
Dr. Seuss television specials
Musical television specials
Films scored by Joe Raposo
Television specials by DePatie–Freleng Enterprises
Films directed by Gerard Baldwin